Nili is the capital city of Nili District in Daykundi Province of Afghanistan. The town of Nili is at 2,022 m altitude. The Nili Airport is located next to the town. The weather conditions in the winter are severe and the roads are difficult.

Due to Nili's geographical inaccessibility and acute security problems, it was not until April 2007 that the United Nations opened an office in Nili of UNAMA (United Nations Assistance Mission in Afghanistan). The town lies almost in the geographical center of the country and the Hazarajat region. The entire population of the district and the town consists of the Hazara ethnic group.

In December 2008, Ms. Azra Jafari was named by President Hamid Karzai to be the mayor of Nili, thus becoming Afghanistan's first female mayor.

The city of Nili has a population of 17,946 (2015 estimate), and has a total land area of 9,022 hectares. There are 1,994 total number of dwellings in Nili city.

Nili is an urban village in central Afghanistan in which the majority of the land (98%) is not built-up. Barren land is the largest land use and accounts for 79% of total land area. There are only 239 hectares of built-up land use, of which 35% is residential and 40% is vacant plots.

On 14 August 2021, Nili was seized by Taliban fighters, becoming the twenty-fourth provincial capital to be captured by the Taliban as part of the wider 2021 Taliban offensive.

Climate 
Nili has a hot-summer humid continental climate (Dsa) in the Köppen climate classification, with dry summers and cold, snowy winters. Precipitation mostly falls in spring and winter.

See also 
 Nili District
 Daykundi Province

References

External links

 , February 5, 2017, United Nations Development Programme (UNDP).

Populated places in Daykundi Province
Provincial capitals in Afghanistan
Cities in Central Asia
Cities in Afghanistan